Bridge Over Troubled Water is a 1970 album by Peggy Lee.

Track listing
"You'll Remember Me" (Stan Worth, Arthur Hamilton) - 3:15
"Bridge Over Troubled Water" (Paul Simon) - 5:05
"The Thrill Is Gone (from Yesterday's Kiss)" (Arthur H. Benson, Dale E. Petite) - 3:33
"Something Strange" (James Fagas) - 3:23
"Have You Seen My Baby" (Randy Newman) - 2:42
"He Used Me" (Jim Weatherly) - 3:48
"(There's) Always Something There to Remind Me" (Burt Bacharach, Hal David) - 2:42
"I See Your Face Before Me" (Arthur Schwartz, Howard Dietz) - 4:01
"Raindrops Keep Fallin' on My Head" (Bacharach, David) - 3:50
"What Are You Doing the Rest of Your Life?" (Alan and Marilyn Bergman, Michel Legrand) - 3:06

Personnel 
Peggy Lee - vocals, guitar

References

1970 albums
Capitol Records albums
Peggy Lee albums
Albums conducted by Mike Melvoin
Albums arranged by Mike Melvoin